Rainbow Connection IV is the fourth album released by the Funk band Rose Royce on the Whitfield label in August 1979. It was produced by Norman Whitfield. This would be the last album to include lead singer Gwen Dickey before she left the group to embark on a solo career.

History
The album peaked at #22 on the R&B albums chart. It also reached #74 on the Billboard 200. Two singles were released from the album, "Is It Love You're After" and "What You Waitin' For". "Is It Love You're After" peaked at #31 on the Billboard R&B Singles chart.  It was more successful on the UK Singles Chart, reaching #13. "What You Waitin' For" failed to chart. The album was digitally remastered and reissued on CD in 2010 by Wounded Bird Records.

Track listing

Personnel
Rose Royce
Gwen Dickey – lead vocals
Kenny Copeland – trumpet, lead vocals
Kenji Brown – guitar, lead vocals
Lequeint "Duke" Jobe – bass, vocals
Michael Nash – keyboards
Henry Garner – drums, vocals
Freddie Dunn – trumpet
Michael Moore – saxophone
Terry Santiel – congas

Additional musicians
Walter Downing – Clavinet, Rhodes
Lafayette Trey Stone, Isy Martin, Wah Wah Watson – guitar
Jack Ashford – tambourine, cowbell

Production
Norman Whitfield – producer, arranger, mixing engineer, album concept
Michael Nash – producer ("Pazazz")
Bruce Miller – string and horn arrangements
Leanard Jackson, Steve Smith – recording engineer, mixing engineer
Norman Moore – cover design
Scott Hensell – photography
Tim Bryant/Gribbitt! – art direction
Bill Whitfield – album coordinator

Charts

Singles

References

External links
 

1979 albums
Rose Royce albums
Albums produced by Norman Whitfield
Whitfield Records albums